Carlos Eduardo de Souza Tomé  (born 11 March 1985 in Mari, Paraiba), known as Dudu Paraíba, is a Brazilian footballer, who plays for Perilima.

Career
Dudu Paraíba started his career at Botafogo (PB) and moved to Vitória (BA) in April 2002, where he signed his first professional contract in April 2005.In January 2007 he was loaned to Avaí, but 3 months later he was sold to Bulgarian club Marek Dupnitsa.
After another 3 months he left the club for Litex Lovech, where he played one and a half years, before being released in January 2009.

On 29 July 2009, he signed a contract with Polish club Widzew Łódź. In the 2010–11 season of the Polish Ekstraklasa he was the player with the most goal assists in the entire league. On 22 June 2013, he signed a contract with Polish club Śląsk Wrocław.

Honours
Litex Lovech
 Bulgarian Cup: 2007/2008, 2008/2009

References

External links
 
 

1985 births
Living people
Brazilian footballers
Brazilian expatriate footballers
Botafogo Futebol Clube (PB) players
Avaí FC players
PFC Marek Dupnitsa players
PFC Litex Lovech players
Esporte Clube Vitória players
Widzew Łódź players
Śląsk Wrocław players
Apollon Limassol FC players
União Recreativa dos Trabalhadores players
Odra Opole players
Lobos BUAP footballers
First Professional Football League (Bulgaria) players
Ekstraklasa players
I liga players
Ascenso MX players
Cypriot First Division players
Sportspeople from Paraíba
Association football fullbacks
Expatriate footballers in Bulgaria
Expatriate footballers in Poland
Expatriate footballers in Mexico
Expatriate footballers in Cyprus
Brazilian expatriate sportspeople in Bulgaria
Brazilian expatriate sportspeople in Poland
Brazilian expatriate sportspeople in Mexico
Brazilian expatriate sportspeople in Cyprus
Association football midfielders